Rory O'More Bridge is a road bridge spanning the River Liffey in Dublin, Ireland and joining Watling Street (by the Guinness grounds) to Ellis Street and the north quays.

The original wooden bridge on this site, built in 1670, was officially named Barrack Bridge because of the proximity of the Royal Barracks. However, it became known locally as Bloody Bridge, following an incident in which ferrymen attempted to destroy the bridge on several occasions (in an ill-fated attempt to protect their livelihoods). Twenty men were arrested and while they were being transferred to the Bridewell Prison, a rescue attempt was made resulting in the death of four men.

The timber bridge was replaced by a stone bridge in 1704, and in 1811, a stone and masonry gateway known as the Richmond Tower was constructed beside it by the architect Francis Johnston. This tower was later relocated to the Royal Hospital, Kilmainham after traffic congestion increased with the arrival of the railway in 1847. The Barrack Bridge was replaced in 1859 by the cast-iron structure which is present to this day.

Designed by George Halpin, the bridge was fabricated at the foundry of Robert Daglish in St Helens, Lancashire, from cast iron (with a wrought iron deck) and is supported on granite abutments. Both the upstream and the downstream sides of the bridge were transported by ship and brought up river to be manoeuvred into position at the site. The bridge was completed in 1859 and opened to the public in 1861 by Queen Victoria and Prince Albert as the Victoria & Albert Bridge (or the Queen Victoria Bridge).

The bridge was renamed in the 1930s for Rory O'More (1600–1655), one of the key figures from the plot to capture Dublin as part of the Irish Rebellion of 1641.

References

Bridges in Dublin (city)
Bridges completed in 1859
O'Moore family